Adrian Wooldridge (born 1959) is an author and columnist. He is the Global Business Columnist at Bloomberg Opinion.

Life and career 
Wooldridge was educated at Balliol College, Oxford, where he studied modern history and was awarded a fellowship at All Souls College, also at Oxford University, where he received a doctorate in philosophy in 1985. From 1984 to 1985, he was also a Harkness Fellow at the University of California, Berkeley.

Wooldridge worked at The Economist weekly British newspaper for more than 20 years. He was The Economists Washington Bureau chief and the "Lexington" columnist, and was the "Schumpeter" columnist (business, finance and management) until the end of 2016. As of June 2021, he was The Economists political editor and "Bagehot" columnist, which was described as "an analysis of British life and politics, in the tradition of Walter Bagehot".

In September 2021, Wooldridge joined Bloomberg Opinion as the Global Business Columnist.

Bibliography

The Aristocracy of Talent: How Meritocracy Made the Modern World (2021)
Co-wrote (with John Micklethwait):
The Witch Doctors: Making Sense of the Management Gurus (1996)
A Future Perfect: The Challenge and Promise of Globalization (2000)
The Company: A Short History of a Revolutionary Idea (2003)
The Right Nation: Conservative Power in America (2004)
God is Back: How the Global Revival of Faith Is Changing the World (2009)
The Fourth Revolution: The Global Race to Reinvent the State (2014)
The Wake-Up Call: Why the Pandemic Has Exposed the Weakness of the West, and How to Fix It (2020)

Awards
2017 Gerald Loeb Award for Commentary for "Creative Destruction: The Schumpeter Column"

References

External links
Journalist profile at Bloomberg Opinion
Adrian Wooldridge's final Lexington column

Living people
Alumni of Balliol College, Oxford
The Economist people
English atheists
Place of birth missing (living people)
Harkness Fellows
Fellows of All Souls College, Oxford
University of California, Berkeley alumni
1959 births
Gerald Loeb Award winners for Columns, Commentary, and Editorials
Carnegie Council for Ethics in International Affairs